Absconditella rosea is a species of crustose lichen in the family Stictidaceae. Found in Venezuela, it was formally described as a new species in 2018 by lichenologists Klaus Kalb and André Aptroot. The specific epithet refers to the pale pinkish colour of the ascomata. The lichen is only known to occur in Venezuela. A similar species in genus Absconditella is A. lignicola, which can be distinguished from A. rosea by its whitish apothecia and differences in ascospore morphology.

References

Ostropales
Lichen species
Lichens described in 2018
Lichens of Venezuela
Taxa named by André Aptroot
Taxa named by Klaus Kalb